Six Tears of Sorrow is the debut EP released by French metal band Scarve.

Track listing
 "Liquefied Silhouettes" (Dirk Verbeuren, Scarve) – 4:00
 "Shelly's Dead" (Fred Bartolomucci, Scarve) – 4:22
 "Blackloader" (Dirk Verbeuren, Scarve, Seb Daniel) – 4:17
 "Torn Underneath" (Dirk Verbeuren, Scarve) – 5:10
 "IMDI" (Fred Bartolomucci, Scarve) – 5:14
 "Anchored in Melancholy" (Dirk Verbeuren, Scarve) – 6:09

Personnel
 Fred Bartolomucci – vocals
 Sylvain Coudret – lead guitar
 Patrick Martin – rhythm guitar
 David Fioraso – bass guitar
 Dirk Verbeuren – drums

Scarve albums
1996 debut EPs
Self-released EPs